Martin Pěnička (10 December 1969 – 25 February 2023) was a Czech footballer who played as a defender, mainly for Slavia Prague, where he spent four seasons in the Czech First League, making over 100 appearances in this period and scoring 12 goals. Pěnička represented his country at under-21 level. He was the brother of player Pavel Pěnička.

Pěnička died on 25 February 2023, at the age of 53.

References

External links 

Profile & stats- Lokeren

1969 births
2023 deaths
Czech footballers
Czechoslovak footballers
Association football defenders
Czechoslovakia under-21 international footballers
Czech First League players
Belgian Pro League players
FC Slovan Liberec players
FK Hvězda Cheb players
SK Slavia Prague players
FC Zbrojovka Brno players
FK Mladá Boleslav players
K.S.C. Lokeren Oost-Vlaanderen players
Czech expatriate footballers
Czech expatriate sportspeople in Belgium
Expatriate footballers in Belgium